Kočićevo is a South Slavic toponym, derived from the possessive form of the "Kočić family" - Kočić's.

Kočićevo, Bačka Topola, in Serbia
Kočićevo (Gradiška), in Bosnia and Herzegovina

See also
Petar Kočić (1877–1916), Serbian writer